Eric Jacobsen may refer to:

 Eric Jacobsen (basketball), American basketball player
 Eric Jacobsen (chemist), American chemist
 Eric Jacobsen (conductor), American conductor and cellist
 Eric Jacobson, American puppeteer

See also 
 Erik Jacobsen, American record producer